Slippy McGee is a 1923 American silent drama film directed by Wesley Ruggles and based on the book Slippy McGee: Sometimes Known as the Butterfly Man by Marie Conway Oemler that was published in 1917. The film was an Oliver Morosco Production released by Associated First National and featured actress Colleen Moore as Mary Virginia. It is not known whether the film survives.

Plot
The title is also the moniker of a renowned safe-cracker, Slippy McGee, who has always managed to evade capture until his latest job, when he is wounded. He escapes aboard a freight train, bound for parts unknown, and finds himself in the town of Appleborro. There, he is discovered and cared for by Father De Rance and Mary Virginia. His leg is amputated, and during his recovery in Appleborro, the town's influence causes him to reform. He becomes interested in the local butterflies, De Rance's hobby, and becomes so knowledgeable in them that he becomes a published expert. Slippy has fallen in love with Mary Virginia, but she plans to marry Lawrence Mayne. However, George Inglesby determines that he wants Mary Virginia for himself, and decides to blackmail Mary Virginia into marrying him using incriminating letters he has in his possession. Wishing Mary to be happy, Slippy resorts to his old ways, breaking into the safe where the letters are kept and thus freeing Mary Virginia of the power George has over her.

Cast
Colleen Moore as Mary Virginia
Wheeler Oakman as Slippy McGee
Sam De Grasse as Father De Rance
Edmund Stevens as George Inglesby
Edith Yorke as Madame De Rance
Lloyd Whitlock as Howard Hunter
Pat O'Malley as Lawrence Mayne
Mary Connor
William Foster as Judge Mayne
Katherine Healy
Frances Smith
Bardell Wheeler

Production
Production on the film began in June 1921 with Colleen's return from New York and Florida, where she was making The Lotus Eater with John Barrymore which was directed by Marshall Neilan. Upon her return to Los Angeles, she left again after a few weeks for location work at Natchez, Mississippi, which filled in for the fictional town of Appleborro. Colleen was taken with the town, and spoke well of the hospitality she and the Slippy McGee troupe were treated to. It was not the first film production the town had hosted. The film would not be released until two year later, in 1923.

Footnotes

 Natchez Democrat, July 12, 1921, page 4.
 "Natchez Is on the Map," by Grace Kingsley, Los Angeles Times, August 14, 1921, page III1 and page III16.

Bibliography
 Silent Star, by Colleen Moore.
 Jeff Codori (2012), Colleen Moore; A Biography of the Silent Film Star, McFarland Publishing,(Print , EBook ).
Colleen Moore research/history project page

External links

AFI Silent Catalog listing for Slippy McGee

American silent feature films
1923 films
Films shot in Mississippi
Films directed by Wesley Ruggles
Films based on American novels
American black-and-white films
Silent American drama films
1923 drama films
1920s American films